Phostria delilalis is a moth in the family Crambidae. It was described by Francis Walker in 1859. It is found in Tefé, Brazil.

References

2. Phostria delilalis Walker 1859

3. Moths of Colombia 

Phostria
Moths described in 1859
Moths of South America